Charles VII may refer to:

 Charles VII of Sweden (1130–1167), actually Charles I of Sweden (1161–1167)
 Charles VII of France (1403–1461), "the Victorious"
 Charles VII, Holy Roman Emperor (1697–1745)
 Charles III of Spain (1716–1788), and Charles VII of Naples
 Carlos María de los Dolores (1848–1909), pretender to the throne of Spain, styled "Charles VII" by Carlists
 Charles VII, Archduke of Austria

See also 
 King Charles (disambiguation)
 Charles